Major Archibald Church  (7 September 1886 – 23 August 1954) was a British school teacher, soldier and Labour Party then National Labour politician. He served as the Member of Parliament (MP) for Leyton East from 1923 to 1924, and for Wandsworth Central from 1929 to 1931.

Early life
Church was born on 7 September 1886 in London, England and was educated at University College, London. He was a schoolmaster from 1909 to 1914 when he joined the Army at the start of the First World War.

Military career
Church served on the Western Front for three years with the Royal Garrison Artillery then the Royal Flying Corps. He was transferred to North Russia to command the Centre Column of the 237 Infantary Brigade. In January 1919, Church was awarded the Military Cross (MC) for his service during the First World War, and in January 1920 he was awarded the Distinguished Service Order (DSO) for action in the Murmansk Command during the British intervention in the Russian Civil War. The citation noted his "particular gallantry and zeal during the operations from Medevja-gora to Unitsa, 8 June to 26 July 1919".

Political career
Failed 1922 campaign
Church first stood for Parliament at the 1922 general election, when he lost by a 35:65 ratio of votes in the Conservative-held part-rural, suburban Spelthorne seat.

Successful 1923 campaign and loss in 1924
At the 1923 general election he won the mainly urban Leyton East seat by a 7% margin from Unionist (Conservative) E.E. Alexander but the latter took it back in 1924 by the same rounded margin.

Successful 1929 campaign
He took urban, more middle class, Wandsworth Central returning to the Commons at the next general election in 1929 general election. He took it from Sir Henry Jackson, a recently knighted Conservative, noted in transport services. He won a slender majority of 300 votes (1.1% of the total).

Eugenic voluntary sterilisation bill
In July 1931, Church tabled a Ten Minute Rule Bill promoted by the Eugenics Education Society. Although the eugenics measure was "a Bill to enable mental defectives to undergo sterilizing operations or sterilizing treatment upon their own application, or that of their spouses or parents or guardians," its underlying purpose was the eventual introduction of compulsory sterilisation, with Church describing it as "an experiment on a small scale so that later on we may have the benefit of the results and experience gained in order to come to conclusions before bringing in a Bill for the compulsory sterilisation of the unfit." The Commons voted by 167 votes to 89 against any second reading.

Move to NLO and failed 1931 campaign
When the Labour Prime Minister Ramsay MacDonald left the party in 1931 to co-lead a Conservative-dominated National Government, Church was one of the few Labour MPs to support him. He followed MacDonald into the new National Labour Organisation then that year stood in the 1931 general election as a National Independent for the London University seat, where he lost by a 27:73 ratio against one candidate.

He stood again twice, as a National Labour (NLO) candidate: in Bristol East at the 1935 general election then in Derby at a by-election in July 1936, and in Tottenham South as an "Independent National" candidate (the local Conservatives had nominated their own candidate) at the 1945 general election Church came in third, Labour winning the seat. This was Church's last election. 

In March 1934 he was appointed as a member of a Royal Commission established to enquire into the organisation and work of the University of Durham.

References

External links

1886 births
1954 deaths
British Army personnel of the Russian Civil War
British Army personnel of World War I
British eugenicists
Companions of the Distinguished Service Order
Labour Party (UK) MPs for English constituencies
National Labour (UK) politicians
People educated at University College School
Politics of the London Borough of Wandsworth
Recipients of the Military Cross
Royal Garrison Artillery officers
UK MPs 1923–1924
Military personnel from Middlesex
UK MPs 1929–1931